One Gold Radio Ltd (now More FM Ltd), until 3 July 2011, shared a network service with TotalStar radio station based in Cheltenham, England.

TotalStar in Cheltenham, Gloucestershire – and the Total Star brand – is owned by Storm Radio Ltd.

2011 changes

In 2011, a number of changes were made to the network of stations operated under the Total Star banner. The licence for Bath was re-awarded by Ofcom to Celador, operator of Bristol's The Breeze 107.2, and the Bath service was renamed as The Breeze later in the year. Furthermore, One Gold Radio and Storm Radio made a complete split of Total Star operations, with the Cheltenham station becoming a standalone service and retaining the Total Star brand, and the One Gold Radio-operated services in Wiltshire adopting the brand name More FM.

One GOLD Radio is a radio station on the Costa Blanca, Spain and is run by Mike Read and some of the team that also work at Total Star.

References

One GOLD Radio web site

Radio broadcasting companies of the United Kingdom